Zerrin Güngör (born 1955, in Kırşehir) is the president of the Turkish Council of State.

She was born on 20 March 1955 in Kırşehir. After finishing Kırşehir high school she moved to Ankara for higher education. After graduating from Academy of Economics and Finance in 1976, she served in tax courts of Bolu and Ankara. In 1999, she was appointed to the Turkish council of state. In 2008 she became the a member of the council board and in 2012 she was elected as the deputy president of the council.
On 18 June 2013, the former president was retired and after many election cycles, Zerrin Güngör was able to receive 80 votes, higher than the minimum number of votes necessary to be elected.
 
She is married and the mother of two.

Zerrin Güngör is the third woman president in the history of the council. Two former woman presidents were Firuzan İkincioğulları and Sumru Çörtoğlu.

See also
 Legal System in the Republic of Turkey

References

1955 births
People from Kırşehir
Turkish women civil servants
Turkish civil servants
Living people
Presidents of the Council of State (Turkey)